The Ship Characteristics Board was a unit of the United States Navy.

The purpose of the Ship Characteristics Board was to coordinate the creation of 'ship characteristics' that are essential to the design of naval combatants and auxiliaries. Coordination was required because the operators and the designers of ships had different interests, perceptions, and concepts: as summarized by the naval historian Norman Friedman, "How to achieve the best possible compromise among competing bureaus has been one of the great dilemmas of 20th-century U.S. naval administration."

This list of SCB projects is a useful exposition of the U.S. Navy's shipbuilding priorities in the first half of the Cold War.

History
The Ship Characteristics Board was founded in 1945 under the Office of the Chief of Naval Operations / OpNav. It was created after the body previously responsible for coordinating ships characteristics, the General Board, had been seen as ineffective in a series of earlier Navy bureau miscoordinations. The SCB would adjudicate between operational requirements set by the ship operators (the fleets and other operational forces) and the technological and fiscal constraints imposed on the ship designers (the Bureau of Ships / BuShips and the Bureau of Ordnance / BuOrd).

The SCB assigned numbers to its projects beginning in 1946. Not all projects would result in the construction of ships: some projects would remain conceptual only, or would be superseded by later projects.

In 1966 the successors to BuShips and BuOrd (NAVSHIPS and NAVORD) were moved to report to OpNav. The SCB role as an adjudicator became less relevant. During the development of the Oliver Hazard Perry class frigates it was renamed the Ship Acquisition and Improvement Board (SAIB). In the 1980s it was revived as the Ship Characteristics Improvement Board (SCIB), but without its former authority.

USS Thresher loss
 A decision by the SCB likely contributed to the 1963 loss of the nuclear submarine Thresher. The SCB had ordered BuShips to study increasing the test depth for future submarines from 700 to 1,600 feet, and this increase was approved after November 1956. Thresher components were too far along in design to accommodate this change, but it was decided that they could be modified to enable a test depth of 1,300 feet. The irony is that the SCB's motives for this change were to enhance safety: not only to support greater combat survivability, but also out of a concern that the increased speed of nuclear submarines could cause them to inadvertently exceed the more shallow test depths while maneuvering.

List of SCB projects
Review of the following lists of SCB projects will show:

SCB projects which are 'follow on' to earlier projects may be given a new number, or may reuse an earlier number with an appended letter. For example,  a project to develop a new Landing Craft Utility (LCU) was begun in 1946 as SCB 25, follow on LCU projects include SCB 25A (unknown date), SCB 149 (August 1954), and SCB 149B (March 1962). Note the eight-year gap between SCB 149 and SCB 149B.
The start date of an SCB project can be several years before it became a budget line item or an actual ship construction. SCB 157 began in July 1955 as a study for a new amphibious assault helicopter carrier, but a resultant ship (the future Iwo Jima) was not laid down until 2 April 1959. An even more extreme example is SCB 123, which began in 1954, but which saw last ship reconstruction delayed until 1966.
Close examination of SCB projects will occasionally demonstrate that ship design history is more complicated than first appearances show. For example, the George Washington class of fleet ballistic missile submarines was the first such class to be launched. However, the history of SCB 180 shows that the Ethan Allen class was the first to be designed, and the George Washington class was a subsequent design made for a quickly implemented mobilization effort.
 The budgetary pressures of the Vietnam War, including war driven inflation, are demonstrated in the cancellation of SCB projects 003.68 and 101.68, and the partial cancellation of SCB 002 (the age of the ships was also a factor).

All ship hull classification symbols shown (CLK, SS, DL, CVA, DE, etc.) are the symbols in use at the conception of the project, rather than when construction started. Explanations of these symbols are usually to be found in the linked articles on each ship or class.

Sequential numbering of SCB projects
SCB projects began in numeric sequence in 1946, and were originally listed in descending priority (the Norfolk cruiser/destroyer leader having top priority, the Tang submarines as second priority, etc.), but such prioritization was eventually dropped. Several of the early projects actually began in 1945 - for example, the Mitscher-class destroyer (which in 1946 was assigned the project number SCB 5) was the ship design that out-performed the projected CL-154 class light cruiser design and led to that cruiser's cancellation in September 1945.

Block numbering of SCB projects
By 1965 the numeric sequence was abandoned and SCB projects were organized by block numbers which arranged projects by ship types (valid until the 1975 ship reclassification), and a two digit suffix denoting the fiscal year of the construction phase of the project. This suffix is not the start date of the project as a concept: SCB 400.65 actually began in November 1962, not in 1965, and SCB 409.68 actually began in February 1965, not in 1968. The existence of successive suffixes also does not necessarily mean that the design of ships of a class in any way changed, such suffixes are listed here for historical note only.

In effect, this new numbering scheme changed the focus of the SCB from design and development to procurement and budget compliance. As a result, concept-only designs would disappear from the historical record.

CIP 
The SCB also had a list of projects called Class Improvement Projects. These were usually changes of a lesser scope or risk than SCB projects; many were contingency plans to refurbish reserve ships had it been necessary to reactivate them. No list of CIP numbers is available.

See also 
List of ships of Russia by project number
Military acquisition
Naval architecture
United States Navy bureau system

References

Notes

Sources 
 Crierie, Ryan. "US Navy Ship Characteristic Board (SCB) Numbers" Accessed 22 September 2008.
 
 
 
 
 
 
 
 
 
 
 Roberts, Stephen S. "Class: CURTISS (AV-4)" Accessed 12 July 2008.
 Roberts, Stephen S. "Class: CURRITUCK (AV-7)" Accessed 12 July 2008.
 Roberts, Stephen S. "Class: CATSKILL (LSV 1-2)" Accessed 25 July 2008.
 Roberts, Stephen S. "Class: TERROR (CM-5)" Accessed 29 December 2008.
 Roberts, Stephen S. "Class: MISPILLION (AO-105)" Accessed 4 August 2010.
 Roberts, Stephen S. "U.S. Navy Ship Design Project Numbers, 1946-1979 ("SCB Numbers")" Accessed 11 October 2022.
 

Bureaus of the United States Navy